Vraignes may refer to two communes in the Somme department in northern France:
 Vraignes-en-Vermandois
 Vraignes-lès-Hornoy